The Archdiocese of Freiburg im Breisgau (Latin Archidioecesis Friburgensis) is a Roman Catholic diocese in Baden-Württemberg comprising the former states of Baden and Hohenzollern. The Archdiocese of Freiburg is led by an archbishop, who also serves as the metropolitan bishop of the Upper-Rhine ecclesiastical province for the suffragan dioceses of Mainz and Rottenburg-Stuttgart. Its seat is Freiburg Minster in Freiburg im Breisgau.

The 14th Archbishop of Freiburg, Robert Zollitsch, followed his predecessor Oskar Saier, who served from 1978 to 2002. On May 30, 2014 Stephan Burger was elected by the Chapter as the new Archbishop of Freiburg. He was ordained as bishop on June 29, 2014.

History 

The Ecclesiastical Province of Freiburg (Kirchenprovinz Freiburg) or Upper Rhenish Ecclesiastical Province (Oberrheinische Kirchenprovinz) is an ecclesiastical province of the Roman Catholic Church in the Upper Rhine area of Germany, centring on Freiburg im Breisgau. It covers the Roman Catholic Archdiocese of Freiburg, the Roman Catholic Diocese of Mainz and the Roman Catholic Diocese of Rottenburg-Stuttgart, covering large areas of Baden-Württemberg and Hesse and small parts of Rhineland-Palatinate. Its metropolitan bishop is the Archbishop of Freiburg - that Archdiocese and the Province were both set up in 1821 in the wake of the 1801 Concordat and the 1815 Congress of Vienna.

In 1821 the Archdiocese of Freiburg was founded out of the Diocese of Constance as well as parts of the Mainz, Straßburg, Worms and Würzburg dioceses. Bernhard Boll became the first bishop in 1827. Well known successors were  Conrad Gröber and Hermann Schäufele.

Today, church closures are not seen in the archdiocese of Freiburg. The same goes for the consolidation of parishes. The Archdiocese of Freiburg exercises the concept of "unions of pastoral guidance."

On November 1, 2005 the archbishop Dr. Robert Zollitsch enacted "Pastoral Guidelines" for the first time in the history of the Archdiocese. These guidelines are given the title "Shaping the awakening."

Patron saints 

Virgin Mary
Conrad of Constance (Bishop of Constance)
Gebhard of Constance (Bishop of Constance)

Diocese organization 

The Archdiocese is organized into seven regions, and these regions are in turn organized into numerous deaneries.

Region of Odenwald / Tauber
Deanery of Tauberbischofsheim
Deanery of Lauda
Deanery of Buchen
Deanery of Mosbach
Region of Rhine / Neckar
Deanery of Weinheim
Deanery of Mannheim
Deanery of Heidelberg
Deanery of Wiesloch
Deanery of Kraichgau
Region of Middle Oberrhein / Pforzheim
Deanery of Philippsburg
Deanery of Bruchsal
Deanery of Bretten
Deanery of Karlsruhe
Deanery of Pforzheim
Deanery of Ettlingen
Deanery of Murgtal
Deanery of Baden-Baden
Region of Ortenau
Deanery of Offenburg
Deanery of Acher-Renchtal
Deanery of Lahr
Deanery of Kinzigtal
Region of Breisgau / Schwarzwald / Baar
Deanery of Breisach / Endingen
Deanery of Waldkirch
Deanery of Freiburg
Deanery of Neuenburg
Deanery of Neustadt
Deanery of Villingen
Deanery of Donaueschingen
Region of Hochrhein
Deanery of Wiesental
Deanery of Waldshut
Deanery of Säckingen
Deanery of Wutachtal
Region of Lake Constance / Hohenzollern
Deanery of Western Hegau
Deanery of Eastern Hegau
Deanery of Konstanz
Deanery of Linzgau
Deanery of Meßkirch
Deanery of Sigmaringen
Deanery of Zollern

The northernmost archdiocese jurisdiction is the parish of St. Laurentius in Freudenberg.

Church institutions

Schools 
Through its scholarly foundation the Archdiocese of Freiburg administers 17 comprehensive secondary schools (Gymnasien), 6 secondary schools (Realschulen), one primary school, one technical school for elderly care, one vocational college, and two boarding schools.

Seminaries 
The Archdiocese maintains a priestly seminary in Freiburg, the Collegium Borromaeum (CB), where candidates for priesthood live during their theological studies at Freiburg's Albert-Ludwigs University. The CB lies in proximity to the Freiburger Cathedral and the ordinariate of the archbishop. Archbishop Robert Zollitsch was, among other things, a repetitor (tutor) at the CB for several years. Pastoral training takes place in a seminary in St. Peter, where Robert Zollitsch likewise functioned as a lecturer.

Literature

See also
Freiburg Declaration, 2012 letter from Catholic priests

References

External links 
  Official site
 Freiburg - Catholic Encyclopedia article

Freiburg
Religious organizations established in 1821
Freiburg im Breisgau
Freiburg archdiocese
1821 establishments in Baden
 
Roman Catholic ecclesiastical provinces in Germany